The Serbs of Croatia or Croatian Serbs constitute the largest national minority in Croatia. The community is predominantly Eastern Orthodox Christian by religion, as opposed to the Croats who are Roman Catholic.

In some regions of modern-day Croatia, mainly in southern Dalmatia, ethnic Serbs possibly have been present from the Early Middle Ages. Serbs from modern-day Serbia and Bosnia-Herzegovina started actively migrating to Croatia in several migration waves after 1538 when the Emperor Ferdinand I granted them the right to settle on the territory of the Military Frontier. In exchange for land and exemption from taxation, they had to conduct military service and participate in the protection of the Habsburg monarchy's border against the Ottoman Empire. They populated the Dalmatian Hinterland, Lika, Kordun, Banovina, Slavonia, and western Syrmia. From the beginning of the 20th century, the Croat-Serb Coalition led by Croat Frano Supilo and Serb Svetozar Pribićević governed the Kingdom of Croatia-Slavonia until the dissolution of Austria-Hungary. After the creation of the Kingdom of Serbs, Croats and Slovenes in 1918 (later renamed to Yugoslavia), a few thousand Serbs moved to Croatian territory. During World War II, Serbs were targeted for extermination as part of genocide by the Ustashas in the Nazi German puppet state Independent State of Croatia (NDH).

After the beginning of the breakup of Yugoslavia and Croatia's proclamation of independence, the Serbs living in Croatia rebelled against the Croatian government and proclaimed the Republic of Serbian Krajina (RSK) on parts of Croatian territory, which led to the Croatian War of Independence (1991–1995). Several RSK leaders have been later convicted of war crimes by the ICTY. After the Croatian Army's Operation Storm, the RSK ceased to exist, its territory was reincorporated into Croatia, and approximately 200,000 Serbs fled the country. In the post-war period, Serbs were exposed to discriminatory measures and rhetoric, including barriers to employment and property rights, use of the minority languages, as well as denial of genocide in the NDH. Following the 2020 elections, Boris Milošević, member of the Independent Democratic Serb Party (SDSS) and President of the Serb National Council, was elected one of the four Deputy Prime Ministers. Shortly afterward, the Croatian authorities and representatives of the Serbs marked the events of the 1991–95 war together.

Many prominent Croatian Serbs have become internationally recognized in their fields, such as Nikola Tesla, Milutin Milanković, Sava Šumanović, Rade Šerbedžija, Siniša Mihajlović and Peja Stojaković. According to the 2021 census, there were 123,892 Serbs living in Croatia (3.2% of the population) which are recognized as a national minority by the Croatian Constitution and therefore have three permanent seats in the Croatian Parliament.

Overview
Traditional elements of their identity are the Orthodox faith, Cyrillic script and military history, while modern elements are language and literature, civic, social and political values, concern for ethnic status and national organisation, and celebration of the Liberation of Yugoslavia.

According to the 2021 census there were 123,892 ethnic Serbs living in Croatia, 3.2% of the total population. Their number was reduced by more than two-thirds in the aftermath of the 1991–95 War in Croatia as the 1991 pre-war census had reported 581,663 Serbs living in Croatia, 12.2% of the total population.

History

Medieval history

In the 10th-century De Administrando Imperio (DAI), the lands of Konavle, Zahumlje and Pagania (which included parts of southern Dalmatia now in Croatia) is described as inhabited by Serbs who immigrated there from an area near Thessaloniki previously arrived there from White Serbia. However, many scholars like Francis Dvornik, Tibor Živković, Neven Budak among others doubt such a claim and consider that a closer reading of the DAI suggests that the Constantine VII's consideration about the regional population ethnic identity is based on Serbian political rule during the expansion of Časlav in the 10th century and does not indicate ethnic origin. John Van Antwerp Fine Jr. and Noel Malcolm believe that what is today western and proper Bosnia and Herzegovina was part of Croatia, while the rest was divided between Croatia and Serbia. Some members of the Serbian royal family took refuge in Croatia amid dynastic rivalry and war with the First Bulgarian Empire in the 9th and 10th century.

Stefan Vojislav (r. 1018–1043) ruled a territory that included the coastal region from Ston in the north down to Skadar by 1040 after his rebellion against Byzantine rule. Mihailo Vojislavljević (1050–1081) built the St. Michael's Church in Ston, which has a fresco depicting him.  Croatia entered union with Hungary in the beginning of the 12th century. Serbia also entered close relations with Hungary (Béla II married a Serbian princess). Beloš, a member of the Serbian royal family, became the "Ban of Croatia and Dalmatia" in 1142. By the early 13th century, the territory of Hum was under jurisdiction of the Western i.e. Roman Church, while the Serbian Orthodox Church established the diocese of Hum in 1219, seated at Ston, that linked the Pelješac peninsula with Hum which lasted until 1321 when Serbian Orthodox bishop had to withdraw from Ston. Serbia continued to hold parts of southernmost Dalmatia into the 14th century. In 1333 King of Serbia Stefan Dušan sold the Pelješac peninsula and the coast land between Ston and Dubrovnik to the Republic of Ragusa, while Ragusa had to pay an annual tribute and also had to guarantee freedom of worship for Orthodox believers in this territory. Among the oldest Orthodox churches in Croatia are the monasteries of Krupa, Krka and Dragović, but their dating to the 14th century remains controversial as, among other evidence and forgeries, have Romanesque and Gothic architectural characteristics uncommon for the Byzantine-Orthodox style.

According to Yugoslav ethnologist Jovan Erdeljanović, members of the Orlović clan settled in Lika and Senj in 1432, later joining the Uskoks. In 1436 on the Cetina,  Croats, Vlachs, and Serbs appeared at the same time living  on the estate of Ivan Frankopan. Serbs are reported in Hungarian documents as living in Croatia in 1437 (three documents call the Serbs in Syrmia and Slavonia as Rascianos–Rascians) and on 22 November 1447, the Hungarian King Ladislaus V wrote a letter which mentioned "Rascians, who live in our cities of Medvedgrad, Rakovac, both Kalinik and in Koprivnica". Matthias Corvinus complained in a letter from 1462 that 200,000 peoples during the previous three years had been taken from his country by Turks, this information was used as a reference for Serb migration to Hungary. After the Ottoman 
conquests of Serbia and capture of Smederevo fortress in 1459 and fall of Bosnia 1463 different populations of Orthodox Christians moved into Syrmia and by 1483 perhaps 200,000 Orthodox Christians moved into central Slavonia and Syrmia. The Turkish conquest of Bosnia also pushed refugees and migrants into western Croatia.

Early modern period

As many former inhabitants of the Austrian-Ottoman borderland fled northwards or were captured by the Ottoman invaders, they left unpopulated areas. At the beginning of the 16th century settlements of Orthodox Christians were also established in modern-day western Croatia. In the first half of the 16th century Serbs settled Ottoman part of Slavonia while in the second part of the 16th century they moved to Austrian part of Slavonia. In 1550 they established the Lepavina Monastery. As Vlach settlements by name and signature we find marked Mali i Veliki Poganac (Poganetz) which was mentioned as Vlach settlement in 1610 and Lepavina (Lipavina) and Marča Monastery ( Eparchy of Marča ). The Habsburg Empire encouraged people from the Ottoman Empire to settle as free peasant soldiers, establishing the Military Frontiers (Militärgrenze) in 1522 (hence they were known as Grenzers, Krajišnici). When it comes to the Austrian colonization of the Turkish Vlachs to Slavonian Military Frontier and the Vlachs in the Croatian Military Frontier there are some minor differences. Vlachs to western Slavonia or to the Varaždin Generalate of Slavonian Krajina are coming en masse and in a very short time: from yeare 1597 to 1600. To Croatian Krajina and Karlovac Generalate Vlachs arrive in smaller groups but throughout the whole XVII. century. Therefore, the Slavonian region was the first to open the door to the Balkans Vlachs. Biggest number of Vlachs comes from Slavonian Turkish Sandžaks In the first half of the 16th century Serbs settled Ottoman part of Slavonia while in the second part of the 16th century they moved to Austrian part of Slavonia.Serbs were mentioned in the Slavonian area at the end of the 14th century where they along with the Turks plundered and burned villages (Turcos et Rascianos). The Habsburg Empire encouraged people from the Ottoman Empire to settle as free peasant soldiers, establishing the Military Frontiers (Militärgrenze) in 1522 (hence they were known as Grenzers, Krajišnici). They were mostly of Orthodox faith, Serbs and Vlachs (Romance-speaking). Catholic Vlachs were assimilated into Croats, while the Orthodox, under the jurisdiction of the Serbian Orthodox Church, assimilated into Serbs.

 
The militarized frontier would serve as a buffer against Ottoman incursions. The Military frontiers had territory of modern Croatia, Serbia, Romania and Hungary. The colonists were granted small tracts of land, exempted from some obligations, and were to retain a share of all war booty. The Grenzers elected their own captains (vojvode) and magistrates (knezovi). All Orthodox settlers were promised freedom of worship. By 1538, the Croatian and Slavonian Military Frontier were established. Austrians offered land to Serbs and Vlachs which acted as the cordon sanitaire together with Croats against Turkish incursions from the Ottoman Empire. The Military frontiers are virtually identical to the present Serbian settlements (war-time Republic of Serbian Krajina). Colonization into Habsburg lands continued  from  1526  to  well into  the  seventeenth  century. Serbian  communities  were  dotted  about until the twentieth century, preserving memories of their origin.

In 1593, Provveditore Generale Cristoforo Valier mentions three nations constituting the Uskoks: "natives of Senj, Croatians, and Morlachs from the Turkish parts". Many of the Uskoks, who fought a guerrilla war with the Ottoman Empire were Orthodox Christian Serbs, who fled from Ottoman Turkish rule and settled in White Carniola and Žumberak.The Vlachs from Glamoč, Srb and Una area move in among Orthodox Christians and settling in 1530 under protection of King Ferdinand I. on the border of the Julian Alps (now Uskoks mountain) in Žumberak area Tihomir Đorđević points to the already known fact that the name 'Vlach' didn't only refer to genuine Vlachs or Serbs but also to cattle breeders in general. In the Venetian documents from the late 16th and 17th centuries, the name "Morlachs" (another term of Vlachs, first mentioned in the 14th century) was used for immigrants from conquered territory previously of Croatian and Bosnian kingdoms by the Ottoman Empire. They were of both Orthodox and Catholic faith, settled inland of the coastal cities of Dalmatia, and entered the military service of both Venice and Ottoman Empire.

There was a population movement from the Ottoman territories into Venetian Dalmatia in this period. The Venetian government welcomed immigrants, as they protected possessions against the Ottomans. The Morlachs, former Ottoman subjects, helped Venice triple its size in Dalmatia. The bishop of Makarska described how many people migrated from the Ottoman Empire to Venetian territories. Major population movements into Venetian Dalmatia occurred during the 1670s and 1680s. In the summer of 1685, Cosmi, the Archbishop of Split, wrote that Morlach leader Stojan Janković had brought 300 families with him to Dalmatia, and also that around Trogir and Split there were 5,000 refugees from Ottoman lands, without food; this was seen as a serious threat to the defense of Dalmatia. Grain sent by the Pope proved insufficient, and these were forced to launch expeditions into Ottoman territory. Under Janković's leadership Serbs settled in Dalmatia in several waves. In July 1684. around 9000 Serbs settled around borders of Dalmatia. By the end of the same year 1500 Serb families moved from Zagora into Venice territory and the same migration happened in March 1685. when 600 families moved from Cetina under their chieftain Peraičić  The military border was returned in 1881 to the Kingdom of Croatia-Slavonia. In 1918, it became part of the State of Slovenes, Croats and Serbs, which immediately joined the Kingdom of Serbia to form the Kingdom of Yugoslavia.

The formation of the Serbian identity of Vlachs in Croatia began in the 18th century under the influence of the Serbian Orthodox Church (SPC), and most of the local Orthodox priests of the Metropolitanate of Karlovci who were educated in monasteries outside Croatia under the guidance of SPC clergy who came to the southwestern region of the Habsburg monarchy during the Great Migrations of the Serbs (1690–1739). In 1695, Serbian Patriarch Arsenije III Čarnojević organized the SPC's hierarchy in Croatia – the territory of the Military Frontier was 'subjugated' to the Eparchy of Gornji Karlovac, and Varaždin Generalate and the rest of Croatia to the Eparchy of Pakrac (since 1705). The Serbianisation of the Vlachs in southern Croatia was the result of the hierarchical linkage of Orthodox Vlachs from southern Croatian territories, at the time ruled by the Venetians, with the SPC in northern Croatia, which strengthened the ritual and ecclesiastical connection of the Vlachs with the Serb immigrants.

In the 1860s, the Serbian thought began spreading among the Orthodox Christians in the Kingdom of Dalmatia. At first through the religious denomination, and by the time as a sign of national affiliation. There was also a brief occurrence when certain Catholic intellectuals, predominantly in Dubrovnik, were won over by the Serbian thought. They were known as "Serb Catholics". The reason for this was that Dalmatia and the Kingdom of Croatia-Slavonia, at the time ruled by Károly Khuen-Héderváry, were extremely disadvantaged so intellectuals did not want to link themselves to them, while at the same time they found newly created Kingdoms of Serbia and Montenegro with their idea of unification of the South Slavs, appealing. With the creation of Yugoslavia, their political goals were achieved, and after that these "one-time Serbs" disappeared from the political stage. Such developments in the spread of Serbian thought in the Croatian lands were the result of Serbian politicians' plans dating back to the first half of the 19th century when Serbia wasn't an independent country, but a province of the Ottoman Empire. According to the 1844 Ilija Garašanin's Načertanije, they intended to establish a Serbian Empire on the territory of the collapsed Ottoman Empire. At first, its borders were supposed to be the borders of the Ottoman Empire and the Slavs in them, but they gradually expanded to the territory of present-day Croatia (including the Military Frointaire and Dalmatia). To accomplish this, the ground had to be prepared, so that diplomacy and the military would have a stronger base for taking action. The bases for this was the Serbian state law, and where it wasn't possible to appropriate the land with it, the argument of nationality, and when that argument couldn't be applied, then it was necessary to "create" the Serbs among the target population, if not among all, then among the majority. The main target were Orthodox Christians in the neighboring, non-Serb countries. In 1848/50, Serbian government organized a secret network of agents who propagated the Serbian ideas. Those agents were concealed as cultural workers. The famous agents were Georgije Nikolajević and Stjepan Mitrov Ljubiša. The 'creation' of new Serbs was carried out by identification of Orthodox Christianity in Croatia and Bosnia and Herzegovina only with Serbs. Another argument used in the areas with no Orthodox Christians was identifying people who spoke Shtokavian with the Serbs. The idea "all Shtokavians are Serbs" was created by German Slavists in the 1850s, and was promoted by the Austrian government who wanted to equalize Croats and Serbs so that it could more easily rule the Croatian lands and in the next stage conquer Serbia and penetrate across Macedonia to Thessaloniki. The idea was that it was easier to "govern Belgrade and Zagreb if the same language was spoken in them". Geostrategic position of Belgrade in relation to Zagreb further contributed to favoring the Serbs whom Austrians did not perceive as a danger, unlike Croats who had own language, politicians, national consciousness, laws, military tradition and prepared army, as well as international treaties which have affirmed their rights, so Austrians needed someone (Serbs) to discipline the Croats. The same was done by Hungary which became a strong political factor after 1848 and that wished to expand into the Southeast Europe, which was particularly strong during the reign of Károly Khuen-Héderváry over Croatia.

The revolutionary 1848 and the process of building a modern Croatian nation resulted in closer co-operation between Croats and Serbs and recognition of their equality in the sense of Illyrian Movement (also known as the Croatian National Revival) and Yugoslavian ideas. In the 1830s, ideas of the Illyrian Movement spread to Dalmatia. In 1835, Božidar Petranović began publishing the Serbo-Dalmatian Magazine. In the following thirty years, Croats and Serbs worked together in the 'national movement' (by using this neutral name they avoided conflicts) against the Austro-Hungarian unitarism and Italian nationalists. However, since Vuk Karadžić, Ilija Garašanin and Jovan Subotić started writing of Dalmatia as a "Serbian land", and the recognition of Serbia as an independent state at the 1878 Congress of Berlin, the differences between Croats and Serbs in Dalmatia increased. Following Croat enthusiasm with the successful 1878 Austro-Hungarian conquest of Bosnia and Herzegovina, during which many Croatian soldiers died, and them seeking unification of Dalmatia and the Kingdom of Croatia-Slavonia, the conflict between Croats and Serbs was inevitable. In 1879, Serbs from Bukovica voted for the Italian candidate instead of Croat Miho Klaić. This event was called by People's Party's supporters Bukovica betrail. Shortly thereafter, separate Croatian and Serbian parties emerged, but Croatian parties managed to keep the majority in the Diet of Dalmatia while Serbs started cooperating with the Italian nationalists. Prior to this, Serbs in Dalmatia started emphasizing Serbianism more often, and for the Croats emphasize "Slovene, Yugoslavian, Slavic, Illyrian", which Mihovil Pavlinović considered destructive to Croatia so he used only attributes "Croatian" in his political program.

Ban Ivan Mažuranić abolished Serbian education autonomy, which was carried out by the Serbian Orthodox Church (SPC), as part of his educational reforms and liberal endeavors. Despite the interpretation of this move as anti-Serbian, some of the most senior governmental positions during Mažuranić's reign were held by the Serbs; Jovan Živković was Deputy Ban, Livije Radivojević president of the Table of Seven (Supreme Court), and Nikola Krestić President of the Croatian Parliament.

During his 20-year-long reign, marked by violence and aggressive magyarization, Ban Károly Khuen-Héderváry encouraged ethnic conflicts between Croats and Serbs. He introduced Cyrillic in grammar school and equalized it with Latin, and allowed the use of Serbian flags. He has changed the official language in the Kingdom from Croatian into "Croato-Serbian" and appointed Serb Vaso Đurđević to the position of the Speaker of the Croatian Parliament. In 1884, Parliament enacted the so-called "Serbian laws" by which SPC gained the right to independently conduct education on the Croatian territory. In addition, Khuen-Héderváry financially assisted Serbs. During his reign, four out of eight Croatian county prefects, Deputy Ban and Speaker of the Croatian Parliament were Serbs, and Serbs occupied the highest ranks in the judiciary. The main goal of favoring the Serbs was to encourage inter-ethnic (Croat/Serb) conflicts which would lead to the preventing of Croatian resistance against the Austrian Empires' state policies. By the end of the 19th century, on the Vladimir Matijević's initiative, Serbs established a number of institutions such as the Serbian Bank, the Association of Serbian Agricultural Cooperatives and the Serbian Business Association 'Privrednik'.

In 1894, Srbobran, a journal of Serbs in Croatia, which was funded by the Serbian government, published an article titled Our First Decennial in which the author described the awakening of Croatian national consciousness and aspirations to Western values among the Orthodox Christians and the lack of indoctrination with Serbianism among the clergy; "In the Serbian church, we found many priests who didn't know who the Saint Sava was, let alone they wanted to be Sava's apostles, neither safeguard his behests, Orthodox faith and Serbian nationality, nor nourish their flock within them. Among them, we found "Orthodox Croats" who preached from the Serbian enlightener Sava's ambon Croatian thought, and Latin was more dear to them then Cyrlic." The Croatian-Serbian conflict culminated on 10 August 1902, when, after years of controversial writing, Srbobran published a text titled To Investigation Yours or Ours in which author Nikola Stojanović, President of the Serbian Academic Society Zora, denied the very existence of the Croatian nation and predicted the result of the conflict between Croats and Serbs, calling for destruction: "That struggle must lead to the investigation ours or yours. One party must fall. Their geographical position, circumstances in which they live everywhere mixed with the Serbs, and the process of general evolution where the idea of Serbianism means progress, guarantees us that those [falling] will be Croats." Enraged crowds reacted by burning Serbian flags and attacking Serb-owned shops, and buildings used by the Serbian institutions.

 
Formation of the so-called New Course Policies in the first decade of the 20th century was a turning point for the resumption of cooperation between Croats and Serbs with a purpose of fighting for a common interests, as confirmed by the 1905 Zadar Resolution, when the Croats agreed on broad concessions regarding flags, education, language and equality of Serbs. This led to the creation of the Croat-Serb Coalition (HSK) whose policy was based on cooperation with Hungary, the Italian parties in Dalmatia and the Serbs in Croatia and Slavonia, guaranteeing broad concessions regarding the Serb minority in Croatia. Serbs played a disproportionately large role in the political life of the Kingdom of Croatia-Slavonia. Electoral units were not created according to the population but were gerrymandered according to the Governments' interests so, for example, in the 1913 parliamentary election, the Croatian Peasant Party received 12,917 votes and only 3 seats, while the Serb Independent Party received 11,704 votes and 17 seats. Serbs Mišćević, Pribićević, Krajnović, and Budisavljević received 1,062 votes, which was enough for all four of them to get elected, while Croat M. Uroić from the Party of Rights won 1,138 votes but hadn't been elected. According to the 1910 census, 644,955 Serbs lived on the territory of the Kingdom of Croatia-Slavonia, accounting for 24.5% of the population. In 1900, 95,000 Serbs, accounting for 16% of the population, lived in the Kingdom of Dalmatia.

World War I and Kingdom of Yugoslavia
Immediately upon the outbreak of the World War I, all organizations that the government considered favored unification of South Slavs or Serbia, which was on the side of the Allied Powers, were banned. Josip Frank's associates took advantage of some provocations and the anger of the people after the assassination of Archduke Franz Ferdinand by Serb Gavrilo Princip and organized anti-Serbian demonstrations. After a stone was thrown on a parade in which the image of Franz Ferdinand was carried through Zagreb, many cafés and gathering places of pro-Yugoslav politicians as well as Serb-owned shops were demolished. Croat-Serb Coalition MP's were also attacked. On the other hand, members of the Social Democratic Party of Croatia and Slavonia held a rally in which they spoke against the violence. Simultaneously with the large anti-Serbian protests held in Vienna, Budapest and Bosnia and Herzegovina, in which there were wounded and dead, protests against pro-Yugoslav oriented citizens were held in many Croatian cities, including Dubrovnik, in which protesters attacked Serbian Society "Dušan Magnificant" Riots have been reported in Zadar, Metković, Bjelovar, Virovitica and Konavle where protesters burned the Serbian flag. In Đakovo and Slavonski Brod riots become so violent that the army intervention was requested. In addition, a curfew was imposed in the town of Petrinja. In Vukovar and Zemun police managed to prevent more clashes. Most Serbs in Croatia approved assassination. Cases of provocation, such as showing images of King Peter I of Serbia, joy, insults and celebrations, have been reported. 14 Serbs were arrested in Zadar for celebrating the assassination.

Following the end of World War I, previously independent State of Slovenes, Croats and Serbs and Kingdom of Serbia merged in 1918 into the Kingdom of Yugoslavia. The creation of the Kingdom of Yugoslavia led to the formation of stronger ties between Serbs in Croatia and Bosnia and Herzegovina with Serbia. Immediately after 1918, the influx of Serbs from Serbia into the territory of Croatia, in particular in the area of Syrmia and Lika-Krbava County, increased. Relative growth in the number of Serb citizens was recorded in Virovitica (35% increase), and Syrmia and Modruš-Rijeka counties, mainly due to the migration of Serbian war veterans who fought on Macedonian front to Slavonia during agrarian reform which was organized by the authorities. Thus, 25 settlements for volunteers were erected, and 8,000 families settled on the land in the areas of agrarian offices in Osijek and Vukovar. Although most of the Serbian parties in Croatia have been co-operating with Croatian Peasant Party in the struggle against Serbian unitarism for years, following the creation of Banovina of Croatia in 1939, part of Serbs showed a lack of willingness to live in a country with Croat majority. There were also requests for joining the Lika and Kordun districts with the Vrbas Banovina which had Serb majority.

World War II

Following the Invasion of Yugoslavia in April 1941, the Axis powers occupied the entire territory of the Kingdom of Yugoslavia and established a puppet state, the so-called Independent State of Croatia (NDH) on the territory of present-day Bosnia and Herzegovina and Croatia. The Ustaše government saw Serbs, Jews, Romanis and antifascist Croats as a disruptive element and enemies of the Croatian people, and immediately started with their prosecution. One-third of Serbs were to be killed, one-third expelled and one-third forcibly converted to Catholicism, according to a formula devised by Ustaše ministers. Upon the establishment of the NDH, Ustaše officials immediately began making harsh statements against the Serbs. Although some of the prominent Serbs first offered cooperation to the new Ustaše government, Serbs were outlawed. During the first months of NDH's existence, numerous legal decisions were made against the Serbs: they had to leave the public service, had to move to the northern parts of Zagreb, could walk through Zagreb only during the day, had to wear a badge with the letter "P" (stood for "Pravoslavni", meaning Orthodox Christians), the name of their faith was changed from Serbian Orthodox to Greek-Eastern, and usage of the Cyrillic script was prohibited. Ustaše were making lists of Serbs which they used for deportations to Serbia. About 175,000 Serbs were deported from NDH to Serbia during the first two years of NDH's existence. The regime systematically and brutally massacred Serbs in villages in the countryside, using a variety of tools. In addition, Nazi-style concentration camps were set up for enemies of the state, the most notorious being Jasenovac where some 50,000 Serbs were killed. Sisak and Jastrebarsko concentration camp were specially formed for children. During the war, around 300,000 Serbs are estimated to have been murdered under the Ustashe regime as a result of their genocide campaign. Diana Budisavljević, a humanitarian of Austrian descent, carried out rescue operations and saved more than 15,000 children from Ustashe camps.
 Budisavljević and her team was assisted by the Croatian Red Cross and the Zagreb Archdiocese branch of Caritas. Thousands of rescued Serb children  were placed with ethnic Croat families from Zagreb and rural communities.

The Ustasha policy towards Serbs further drove a number of them joined either Chetniks or the Yugoslav Partisans who were particularly strong in the regions of Lika, Kordun and Banovina. In 1941–42, the majority of Partisans in Croatia were Serbs, but by October 1943 the majority were Croats. This change was partly due to the decision of a key Croatian Peasant Party member, Božidar Magovac, to join the Partisans in June 1943, and partly due to the surrender of Italy in September 1943. Furthermore, Ustashe authorities ceding Northern Dalmatia to fascist Italy, Italian terror of the population and misrule of the Ustashe and Axis invaders would further push Croats towards the partisans. At the moment of the capitulation of Italy to the Allies the Serbs and Croats were participating equally according to their respective population sizes as it was in Yugoslavia as a whole. Eventually, Serbian percentage dropped in favor of Croats by the end of the war amounting to 28.6% in 1944 in Croatia. The Serb contribution to Croatian Partisans represented more than their proportion of the local population. After the invasion of Yugoslavia by Axis forces, Serbian uprisings broke out under the Chetnik leadership in Gračac, Srb, Donji Lapac, Drvar and Bosansko Grahovo. The policy of the Chetniks under the leadership of Draža Mihailović varied from the struggle with the Nazis to tactical or selective collaboration with them in different periods throughout the war. The goal of the Chetniks, based on a 1941 directive, was the creation of an ethnically homogeneous Greater Serbia. The largest Chetnik massacres took place in eastern Bosnia within the NDH where they preceded any significant Ustashe operations.  In the territories they controlled, Chetniks committed genocide against the Croat and Muslim civilian populations. However, they also collaborated with some of the Ustashe forces in northern Bosnia and they fought together against the Yugoslav Partisans during the Case White.

A certain change in relations towards Serbs in NDH took place in the spring of 1942 on German demand, as the Germans realized that the Ustaše policy towards Serbs strengthened their rebellion, which was putting pressure on the German army that had to send more of its troops to the NDH territory. Afterwards, Ustaše founded the Croatian Orthodox Church and Serbs were recruited to the Croatian Home Guard units. Ustaše stopped with deportations of Serbs and their forced conversions to Catholicism. However, these measures did not significantly affect the Serb rebellion. The establishment of the Church was done in order to try and pacify the state as well as to Croatisize the remaining Serb population once the Ustaše realized that the complete eradication of Serbs in the NDH was unattainable. Persecution of Serbs continued however, but was less intense. At the beginning of 1942, NDH authorities started making agreements with the Chetniks to avoid conflicts and coordinate actions against the Yugoslav Partisans. On 8 May 1945, Yugoslav Partisans entered Zagreb, which marked the collapse of the Ustaše regime and the liberation of Croatia from the Nazi occupation. Following the end of the war, Croatia entered union with Bosnia and Herzegovina, Macedonia, Montenegro, Serbia, and Slovenia and formed the Socialist Federal Republic of Yugoslavia.

Socialist Yugoslavia
During the Second World War, at the Second and Third sessions of the National Anti-Fascist Council of the Peoples Liberation of Croatia (ZAVNOH) held in October 1943 and May 1944 respectively, the equality of the Serbian and Croatian nations, as constituent nations of the federal unit of Croatia, was recognized in every aspect. Later, in 1963, the Croatian Constitution did not mention the Serbs in Croatia as a constituent nation of SR Croatia. Constitution of 1974 defined Croatia as a "national state of Croatian people, state of Serbian people in Croatia and state of other nationalities that live in it".

On 22 December 1990, HDZ government of Franjo Tuđman promulgated a new Croatian constitution that changed the wording with regard to Serbs of Croatia.  In the first paragraph of the Article 12, Croatian was specified as the official language and alphabet, and dual-language road signs were torn down even in Serb majority areas. Furthermore, a number of Serbs were removed from the bureaucracies and the police and replaced by ethnic Croats. Many Serbs in government lost their jobs, and HDZ made themselves target of Serbian propaganda by having party members attempting to rehabilitate the WWII Croatian fascist movement Ustaše, or by saying that the numbers of people killed in Jasenovac, one of the largest extermination camp in Europe, were inflated. The party representing the interests of Serbs in Croatia, the Serbian Democratic Party (SDS), which rejected the new constitution, began building its own national governmental entity in order to preserve rights that Serbs saw as being stripped away and to enhance the sovereignty of the Croatian Serbs.

Croatian War of Independence

Amid rising of Serbian nationalism and tensions between Yugoslav republics during the breakup of Yugoslavia, on 8 July 1989 Serbs held a rally in Knin during which they exhibited numerous Chetnik symbols and were invoking JNA's military intervention against Croatia. With the introduction of the multiparty system, the first ethnic Serb parties were founded in Croatia, largest being Serb Democratic Party (SDS). Soon afterward, extremist leaders of the Serb movements in Lika, Northern Dalmatia, Kordun, and Podunavlje called for armed rebellion against Croatian government, violence against Croats and refused to recognize legally elected Croatian authorities.

Tension grew following the Croatian Democratic Union's victory in the 1990 general election since one of its political goals was Croatia's independence from Yugoslavia. Jovan Rašković, leader of SDS, refused to participate in the work of the Croatian Parliament in May 1990. Some prominent Serbian politicians and scientists, such as Simo Rajić and Jovan Bamburać, called for coexistence, de-escalation and peace, while others organized Serb parties in the Croatian government-controlled areas, like Milan Đukić, while others, like Veljko Džakula, unsuccessfully tried to organize the parties in the rebelled areas, but their work was prevented by Serb nationalists. On 17 August 1990, part of the Croatian Serbs, supported by Serbia, rebelled against Croatian government in the so-called Log Revolution

On 22 December 1990, Croatian Parliament ratified a new constitution in which Serbs were classified as a national minority. Previously Serbs were considered autochthonous constituent of Croatia. The proclamation of the new constitution was considered by Serbian leaders evidence of Croat hostility towards Serbs. Thus, SDS, which rejected the new constitution, began building its own national governmental entity in order to preserve rights that Serbs saw as being stripped away and to enhance the sovereignty of the Croatian Serbs. A Norwegian historian Øyvind Hvenekilde Seim stated that status of Serbs in Croatia, who made important contributions to Croatian cultural, scientific, and political history, was annulled by actions of president Franjo Tuđman during the 1990s. Sabrina P. Ramet wrote that Tuđman's regime "promoted a traditionalist and exclusive vision of Croatia" as a Croat state in which Serbs were "unwelcome", while journalist Chris Hedges claimed to have transcript documents of a meeting that supposedly showed Tuđman had "planned ethnic cleansing and other war crimes", including "Croatia’s final solution" of its Serbian problem. Under the influence of propaganda and with the support from Serbia as well as in response to actions by President Tudjman's administration, rebelled Serbs established an unrecognized state called Republic of Serbian Krajina (RSK) in hopes of achieving independence and complete self-governance from Croatia. As the popularity of the unification of RSK with Serbia into a Greater Serbia increased, the rebellion against Croatia became more intense. The RSK had de facto control over one-third of Croatian territory during its existence between 1991 and 1995 but failed to gain any international recognition. According to the ICTY, the RSK implemented policies "which advanced the objective to forcibly and permanently remove the majority of Croat and other non-Serb populations from approximately the one-third of Croatia".

In the spring of 1991, an open war broke out. Serb forces, in cooperation with the local Serb authorities, commenced persecutions to drive the Croat and other non-Serb populations from areas such as Krajina, controlled by rebelled Serbs. Nearly all non-Serbs were expelled; between 170,000 and 250,000 people, and hundreds of Croat and other non-Serb civilians were killed. Meanwhile, Serbs living in Croatian towns, especially those near the front lines, were subjected to various forms of discrimination and harassment. Croatian Serbs in Eastern and Western Slavonia and parts of the Krajina, were also forced to flee or were expelled by Croatian forces, though on a restricted scale and in lesser numbers. The Croatian Government sought to stop such occurrences and were not a part of the Government's policy. The war ended with a Croatian military success in Operation Storm in 1995 and subsequent peaceful reintegration of the remaining renegade territory in eastern Slavonia in 1998 as a result of the signed Erdut Agreement from 1995. Local Serbs, on the ground that Agreement, established the Serb National Council and gained the right to establish the Joint Council of Municipalities. During and in the aftermath of Operation Storm about 200,000 Serbs fled from the RSK and hundreds of mainly elderly Serb civilians were killed in the aftermath. Over the course of the war, nearly 7,950 Serbs were killed including 2,344 civilians while almost 16,000 Croats were killed, of which 6,605 were civilians. The conflict led to the displacement of 250,000 Croats and between 250,000 and 300,000 Serbs.

In February 2015, during the Croatia–Serbia genocide case, the International Court of Justice (ICJ) unanimously dismissed the Serbian lawsuit claim that Operation Storm constituted genocide, ruling that Croatia did not have the specific intent to exterminate the country's Serb minority, though it reaffirmed that serious crimes against Serb civilians had taken place. The judgment stated that it is not disputed that a substantial part of the Serb population fled that region as a direct consequence of the military actions. Although it has also been noted that there was an evacuation order given by the RSK's "Supreme Defence Council", based on the testimony by commander Mile Mrkšić at the ICTY. The Croatian authorities were aware that the operation would provoke a mass exodus; they even to some extent predicated their military planning on such an exodus, which they considered not only probable but desirable. Fleeing civilians and people remaining in United Nations protected areas were subject to various forms of harassment, including military assaults and acts by Croatian civilians. On 8 August, a refugee column was shelled. Although it was very difficult to determine the number of properties destroyed during and after Operation Storm since a large number of houses sustained some degree of damage since the beginning of the war, Human Rights Watch (HRW) estimated that more than 5,000 houses were destroyed in the area during and after the battle. Out of the 122 Serbian Orthodox churches in the area, one was destroyed and 17 were damaged. HRW also reported that the vast majority of the abuses were committed by Croatian forces. These abuses, which continued on a large scale even months after Operation Storm, included summary executions of elderly and infirm Serbs who remained behind and the wholesale burning and destruction of Serbian villages and property. In the months following the August offensive, at least 150 Serb civilians were summarily executed and another 110 persons forcibly disappeared. Three Croatian generals, involved in the Operation Storm, were later acquitted by the International Criminal Tribunal for the Former Yugoslavia (ICTY) of charges of committing war crimes and partaking in a joint criminal enterprise to force the Serb population out of Croatia. The ICTY stated that Croatian Army and Special Police committed a large number of crimes against the Serb population after the artillery assault, but that the state and military leadership was not responsible for their creation and organizing. Examples of crimes are massacres, most often elderly Serb villagers killed by the Croatian Army, such as the Varivode massacre, the Kijani massacre and the Golubić massacre.

At the ICTY, Milan Babić was indicted, pleaded guilty and was convicted for "persecutions on political, racial and religious grounds, a crime against humanity". Babić stated during his trial that "during the events, and in particular at the beginning of his political career, he was strongly influenced and misled by Serbian propaganda". RSK President, Milan Martić, was also trialled by the ICTY for various Crimes against humanity and war crimes, including murder, persecution, inhumane treatment, forced displacement, plunder of public or private property, and wanton destruction of cities, towns or villages, as well as ordering an indiscriminate rocket attack on Zagreb, in 1995. On 12 June 2007, Martić was sentenced to 35 years in prison. His sentence of 35 years in prison was confirmed by ICTY appellate council on 8 October 2008. He was found to have been part of a "joint criminal enterprise" which included Blagoje Adžić, Milan Babić, Radmilo Bogdanović, Veljko Kadijević, Radovan Karadžić, Slobodan Milošević, Ratko Mladić, Vojislav Šešelj, Franko Simatović, Jovica Stanišić, and Dragan Vasiljković.

A small minority of pre-war Serb population have returned to Croatia. Today, the majority of the pre-war Serb population from Croatia settled in Serbia and Republika Srpska. After Croatian and other Yugoslav Wars, Serbia became home to highest number of refugees (Serbs who fled from Bosnia and Herzegovina and Croatia) in Europe.

The percentage of those declaring themselves as Serbs, according to the 1991 census, was 12.2% (78.1% of the population declared itself to be Croat). Although today Serbs are formally able to return to Croatia, a majority choose to remain citizens of other countries in which they gained citizenship. However, Croatia also adopted discriminatory measures to prevent the return of Serbs after war, while the Croatian forces continued with abuses on a large scale for months afterward, which included destruction of Serb property. Also, Serbs are still face significant barriers to employment and to regain their property. Consequently, today Serbs constitute 4% of Croatian population, down from the prewar population of 12%. The majority of the remaining population is elderly, which indicates that the negative demographic trend will persist.

Currently, the official status of "autochthonous national minority" for the Serbs of Croatia is recognized by the Croatian Constitutional Act on the Rights of National Minorities from 2002 which supplemented the Constitutional Act on the Human Rights and Freedoms and on the Rights of Ethnic and National Communities or Minorities in the Republic of Croatia from 1992.

Recent history
Tension and violence between Serbs and Croats has reduced since 2000 and has remained low to this day, however, significant problems remain. The main issue is thought to be due to high-level official and social discrimination against the Serbs. In 2005, the Republic of Croatia ratified a bilateral agreement with Serbia and Montenegro on the protection of the Serbian and Montenegrin minority in Croatia and the Croatian national minority in Serbia and Montenegro. Some Croats, including politicians, continue to deny and minimise the magnitude of the genocide perpetrated against Serbs in the Independent State of Croatia. 
At the highest levels of the Croatian government, new laws are continuously introduced in order to combat this discrimination, demonstrating an effort on the part of government. For example, lengthy and in some cases unfair proceedings, particularly in lower level courts, remain a major problem for Serbian returnees pursuing their rights in court. In addition, Serbs continue to be discriminated against in access to employment and in realizing other economic and social rights. Also some cases of violence and harassment against Croatian Serbs continue to be reported.

The property laws allegedly favor Bosnian Croats refugees who took residence in houses that were left unoccupied and unguarded by Serbs after Operation Storm. Amnesty International's 2005 report considers one of the greatest obstacles to the return of thousands of Croatian Serbs has been the failure of the Croatian authorities to provide adequate housing solutions to Croatian Serbs who were stripped of their occupancy rights, including where possible by reinstating occupancy rights to those who had been affected by their discriminatory termination.

The European Court of Human Rights decided against Croatian Serb Kristina Blečić, stripped her of occupancy rights after leaving her house in 1991 in Zadar. In 2009, the UN Human Rights Committee found a wartime termination of occupancy rights of a Serbian family to violate ICCPR. In 2010, the European Committee on Social Rights found the treatment of Serbs in Croatia in respect of housing to be discriminatory and too slow, thus in violation of Croatia's obligations under the European Social Charter. In 2013, the Anti-Cyrillic protests in Croatia were a series of protests in late 2013 against the application of bilingualism in Vukovar, whereby Serbian and the Serbian Cyrillic alphabet were assigned co-official status due to the local minority population.

In 2015 Amnesty International reported that Croatian Serbs continued to face discrimination in public sector employment and the restitution of tenancy rights to social housing vacated during the war. In 2017 they again pointed out that Serbs faced significant barriers to employment and obstacles to regain their property. Amnesty International also said that the right to use minority languages and script continued to be politicized and unimplemented in some towns and that heightened nationalist rhetoric and hate speech contributed to growing ethnic intolerance and insecurity.

Since 2016, anti-fascist groups, leaders of Croatia's Serb, Roma and Jewish communities and former top Croat officials have boycotted the official state commemoration for the victims of the Jasenovac concentration camp because, as they said, Croatian authorities refused to denounce the Ustasha legacy explicitly and they downplayed and revitalized crimes committed by Ustashe.

Following the 2020 Croatian parliamentary election, Boris Milošević, member of the Independent Democratic Serb Party and President of the Serb National Council, was elected one of the four Deputy Prime Ministers of Croatia in charge of social affairs and human and minority rights in the new cabinet of Andrej Plenković. On the 25th anniversary of the Operation Storm, the celebrations were attended for the first time ever by an ethnic Serb political representative, Boris Milošević. On 25 August 2020, Zoran Milanović (President of Croatia), Tomo Medved (Minister of Croatian Veterans), along with members of the Independent Democratic Serb Party, Milorad Pupovac and Deputy Prime Minister Milošević, attended a commemoration of the Grubori massacre, the mass murder of elderly Serbs civilians.

Demographics

According to the 2021 census there were 123,892 ethnic Serbs living in Croatia, 3.20% of the total population. Their number was reduced by more than two-thirds in the aftermath of the 1991–95 War in Croatia as the 1991 pre-war census had reported 581,663 Serbs living in Croatia, 12.2% of the total population.

Counties

Counties with significant Serb minority (7.50% or more):

Cities

Cities with significant Serb minority (10% or more):

Vrbovsko (1,255 or 32.38%)
Obrovac (1,082 or 31.34%)
Vukovar (6,890 or 29.73%)
Hrvatska Kostajnica (428 or 22.78%)
Knin (2,492 or 21.42%)
Glina (1,462 or 20.55%)
Beli Manastir (1,605 or 20.13%)
Skradin (605 or 18.07%)
Ogulin (1,841 or 15.03%)
Benkovac (1,315 or 13.58%)
Pakrac (801 or 11.30%)
Lipik (540 or 10.53%)

Municipalities

Municipalities with significant Serb population (10% or more):

Ervenik (765 or 96.96%)
Negoslavci (952 or 96.85%)
Borovo (3,224 or 90.69%)
Markušica (1,600 or 90.24%)
Trpinja (3,659 or 87.81%)
Biskupija (964 or 81.90%)
Donji Lapac (1,082 or 79.21%)
Šodolovci (950 or 78.06%)
Civljane (126 or 73.68%)
Dvor 2,015 or 67.26%)
Jagodnjak (943 or 62.87%)
Vrginmost (1,282 or 62.63%)
Krnjak (773 or 58.03%)
Erdut (2,908 or 53.68%)
Kistanje (1,375 or 51.89%)
Vrhovine (311 or 47.63%)
Gračac (1,360 or 43.37%)
Udbina (569 or 42.65%)
Plaški (656 or 39.76%)
Vojnić (1,385 or 38.45%)
Donji Kukuruzari (337 or 31.20%)
Topusko (556 or 25.02%)
Plitvička Jezera (838 or 22.97%)
Darda (1,090 or 20.08%)
Majur (150 or 19.74%)
Saborsko (88 or 18.88%)
Stari Jankovci (612 or 18.71%)
Sunja (700 or 16.97%)
Kneževi Vinogradi (554 or 16.50%)
Hrvatska Dubica (240 or 16.42%)
Popovac (235 or 16.25%)
Okučani (371 or 15.97%)
Lovinac (142 or 15.06%)
Rasinja (392 or 14.90%)
Viljevo (227 or 13.96%)
Levanjska Varoš (95 or 12.39%)
Podgorač (296 or 12.06%)
Stara Gradiška (104 or 11.42%)
Sokolovac (312 or 11.19%)
Dežanovac (217 or 10.97%)
Sirač (188 or 10.47%)
Lišane Ostrovičke (60 or 10.12%)

Culture

Serbs in Croatia have cultural traditions ranging from kolo dances and singing, which are kept alive today by performances by various folklore groups. Notable traditions include gusle, diple, Ojkanje singing, and Čuvari Hristovog groba.

Many Serbs contributed to the Croatian culture, such as trader Hristofor Stanković who founded the first permanent theater building in Gornji Grad, Zagreb.

Religion

The Serbs of Croatia are predominantly of the Serbian Orthodox faith. There are many Orthodox churches and monasteries across Croatia, built since the 14th century. Most notable and historically significant are the Krka monastery, Krupa monastery, Dragović monastery, Lepavina Monastery and Gomirje monastery. Many Orthodox churches were demolished during World War II and during the Croatian War of Independence, while some were rebuilt with EU funding, the Croatian government and Serbian diaspora donations.

In the 1560s a Serbian Orthodox bishop was installed in the Metropolitanate of Požega, seated in the monastery of Remeta. In the 17th century, the Eparchy of Marča was founded at Marča, in the Croatian frontier. These were part of the Serbian Orthodox Patriarchate of Peć, which was reestablished in 1557, and lasted under Ottoman governance until 1766. Other bishoprics were founded, although their approval by the Habsburgs hinged on the belief that they would facilitate the union of these Orthodox Christians with the Catholic Church, and in fact, many, including some Orthodox bishops, did unify with Rome.

Serbs in the Croatian Military Frontier were out of the jurisdiction of the Serbian Patriarchate of Peć and in 1611, and after demands from the community, the Pope established the Eparchy of Marča (Vratanija) with seat at the Serbian-built Marča Monastery, with a Byzantine vicar instated as bishop sub-ordinate to the Roman Catholic bishop of Zagreb – working to bring Serbian Orthodox Christians into communion with Rome, which caused struggle of power between the Catholics and the Serbs over the region.

In 1695 Orthodox Eparchy of Lika-Krbava and Zrinopolje was established by metropolitan Atanasije Ljubojević and certified by Emperor Josef I in 1707. In 1735 the Serbian Orthodox protested in the Marča Monastery and became part of the Serbian Orthodox Church until 1753 when the Pope restored the Roman Catholic clergy. On 17 June 1777 the Eparchy of Križevci was permanently established by Pope Pius VI with its Episcopal see at Križevci, near Zagreb, thus forming the Croatian Greek Catholic Church which would after World War I include other people; the Rusyns and ethnic Ukrainians of Yugoslavia.

Jovan, the Metropolitan of Zagreb and Ljubljana stated that  30,000 Serbs had converted to Catholicism since the Operation Oluja (1995). In the 2011 census, regarding religious affiliation,  40,000 declared as "Serbs of the Orthodox faith", while 160,000 declared as "Orthodox".

Language

The Serbian language is officially used in 23 cities and municipalities in Croatia.

In April 2015 the United Nations Human Rights Committee urged Croatia to ensure the right of minorities to use their language and alphabet. The committee report stated that particularly concerns surrounded the use of Serbian Cyrillic in the town of Vukovar and municipalities concerned. Serbian Foreign Minister Ivica Dačić stated that Serbia welcomed the UN Human Rights Committee's report.

Although the 2011 census in Croatia listed Serbs as the largest national minority in Croatia, with 4.4% of the total population, the number of people who had declared Serbian language as their native was only 1.23% of the total population (52,879).

Politics
Serbs are officially recognized as an autochthonous national minority, and as such, they elect three representatives to the Croatian Parliament.

All elected special representatives since 1995 Parliamentary elections.

The major Serb party in Croatia is the Independent Democratic Serb Party (SDSS). In the elections from 2003, the SDSS has won all Serbian seats in the parliament. In the Cabinet of Ivo Sanader II, the party was part of the ruling coalition led by the conservative Croatian Democratic Union, and SDSS member Slobodan Uzelac held the post of Deputy Prime Minister. After that Serbs again entered government during Cabinet of Andrej Plenković II, in which Boris Milošević become Deputy Prime Minister and responsible for Social Affairs and Human and Minority Right.

There are also ethnic Serb politicians who are members of mainstream political parties, such as the centre-left Social Democratic Party's MPs and Milanović cabinet members Željko Jovanović, Branko Grčić and Milanka Opačić.

Croatisation
During the Second World War, the Ustashe regime systematically engaged in the extermination, expulsion and forced conversion of Serbs in Croatia. Facing discrimination after the Croatian War of Independence (1991–95), several anonymous Serbs from Zagreb testify that some young Serbs have converted to Catholicism and changed their surnames in order to 'become Croats'.

Community in Serbia

Approximately 250,000 Serbs from Croatia were resettled in Serbia during and after the Croatian War of Independence, of which the larger part took Serbian citizenship. In 2011, there were 284,334 Serbs from Croatia living in Serbia (excluding Kosovo), with the majority living in Vojvodina (127,884), followed by Central and South Serbia (114,434). In 2013, approximately 45,000 Serbs from Croatia were still listed as refugees in Serbia. The largest part of the Croatian Serb community in Serbia stated that they wished to integrate (60.6%), only 4.3% wanted to return to their homes in Croatia, while 27.4% who were undecided.

Notable people

See also

 Croatia-Serbia relations
 Croats of Serbia
 Serbs of Zagreb
 Serbs of Vukovar
 Serb National Council, elected body acting as a form of self-government and institution of cultural autonomy
 Flag of Serbs of Croatia
 Joint Council of Municipalities
 Independent Democratic Serb Party
 Democratic Alliance of Serbs
 Republic of Serbian Krajina
 Genocide of Serbs in the Independent State of Croatia
 Operation Storm
 Prosvjeta, Croatian Serb Cultural Society
 Serbian Orthodox Secondary School in Zagreb
 Novosti (Croatia)
 Radio Borovo

References

Sources

Books
 
 
  
 
 
  
 Karl Freiherr von Czoernig: "Ethnographie der österreichischen Monarchie", Vol. II, III, Wien, 1857.

Journals

Documents

News

External links

 
 D. Roksandić, Srbi u Hrvatskoj – od 15. stoljeća do današnjih dana, Vjesnik, Zagreb 1991.
 Tradition chest adornment worn in Kninska Krajina
 Croatian census 2001 (see "Censuses" at Crostat Database)

 
Ethnic groups in Croatia
 
Croatia
Serbian Orthodox Church in Croatia